Tizza is a small town in the Jirapa District of the Upper West Region of Ghana. The People of this town speak Dagaare

References

Upper West Region